The February 2008 San Francisco general elections were held on February 5, 2008 in San Francisco, California. The elections included the United States presidential primaries, seven California ballot propositions, and three San Francisco ballot measures.



Propositions 
Note: "City" refers to the San Francisco municipal government.

Proposition A 

Proposition A would allow the City to issue bonds worth a total of $185 million to fund municipal park and recreation facilities and to raise property taxes to fund these bonds, permitting landlords to pass 50% of the increase to tenants. This proposition required a two-thirds majority to pass.

Proposition B 

Proposition B would "allow certain retirement-eligible police officers to continue working for up to three additional years while accumulating their regular retirement benefits in tax-deferred retirement accounts."

Proposition C 

Proposition C would make it City policy to transform Alcatraz Island into a Global Peace Center.

See also 
 California state elections, February 2008
 California Democratic primary, 2008
 California Republican primary, 2008

External links 
 City and County of San Francisco Department of Elections
 City and County of San Francisco February 2008 Presidential Primary Election Statement of Vote

San Francisco 02
2008 02
Elections 02
San Francisco 02
2000s in San Francisco
February 2008 events in the United States